Dr. Richard Yates Mander FRCO LRAM (1862 - 31 March 1917) was an English organist and composer.

Education

He was born in 1862 in Leamington Spa, son of Richard Mander and Esther Evans. His father was a band master.

In 1879 he passed the senior examination of Trinity College of Music, when it was held in Leamington Spa. He was awarded his ARCO in 1883 and his FRCO some time later. He graduated B.Mus (1896) and D.Mus (1902) at Queen's College, Oxford. 

In September 1885, he married Elizabeth Catherine Taylor. The children from this marriage were:
Richard Noel Mander, b. 1886
Ester Maud Mander, b. 1887
Catherine Mary Mander, b. 1889
Lucy Evelyn Mander, b. 1891

He died in Ryde, Isle of Wight, on 31 March 1917 and is buried in Ashey Cemetery.

Appointments

Organist and choir master of St. John’s Church, Leamington Spa 1880 – 1888
Organist of the St Philips Church, Birmingham 1888 - 1898
Organist of All Saints' Church, Ryde 1898 - 1917
He also served as music master of the College of the Blind, Worcester, and of the Royal Naval College at Osborne, Isle of Wight. 
He was teacher and organist of the Birmingham and Midland Institute of Music (1892-95) and organist to Ryde Corporation (from 1899).

Compositions

He wrote 
some organ music.
A Harvest Anthem, Thou Shalt Shew Us Wonderful Things.
"Glory to Thee, my God, this night" (submitted as his B.Mus exercise).

References

1862 births
1917 deaths
English organists
British male organists
English composers
Fellows of the Royal College of Organists
People from Leamington Spa
19th-century English musicians
19th-century British male musicians